HMS Ursula was a Modified Admiralty  destroyer that served in the Royal Navy. The Modified R class added attributes of the Yarrow Later M class to improve the capability of the ships to operate in bad weather. The vessel was launched in 1917 at Greenock in Scotland and served with the Grand Fleet during the First World War. After the war, the destroyer was transferred to the Home Fleet, but then moved to the Reserve Fleet. In 1924, Prince George served aboard Ursula before, in 1929, the vessel was sold to be broken up.

Design and development

Ursula was one of eleven Modified  destroyers ordered by the British Admiralty in March 1916 as part of the Eighth War Construction Programme. The design was a development of the existing R class, adding features from the Yarrow Later M class which had been introduced based on wartime experience. The forward two boilers were transposed and vented through a single funnel, enabling the bridge and forward gun to be placed further aft. Combined with hull-strengthening, this improved the destroyers' ability to operate at high speed in bad weather.

Two funnels were fitted.

Armament consisted of three single  Mk V QF guns on the ship's centreline, with one on the forecastle, one aft on a raised platform and one between the funnels. A single 2-pounder  "pom-pom" anti-aircraft gun was carried on a platform between two twin mounts for  torpedoes. The ship had a complement of 82 officers and ratings.

Construction and careers
Laid down on 22 September 1916 by Scotts at Greenock with the yard number 480, Ursula  was launched on 21 April 1917 and completed on 26 September. The vessel was the first of the name. On commissioning, Ursula joined the Thirteenth Destroyer Flotilla of the Grand Fleet. The flotilla took part in the Royal Navy's engagement with one of the final sorties of the German High Seas Fleet during the First World War, on 24 April 1918, although the two fleets did not actually meet and the destroyer saw no action.

At the end of the war, Ursula was still part of the Thirteenth Destroyer Flotilla under the cruiser . The vessel was transferred to the Fifth Destroyer Flotilla under the flag of  when the Home Fleet was formed, but was reduced to the Reserve Fleet on 23 August 1920. On 18 July 1924, the destroyer was briefly the home for Prince George, who served as an acting midshipman during a naval review. However, the Navy decided to retire many of the older destroyers in preparation for the introduction of newer and larger vessels. The destroyer was one of those selected and was sold to Cashmore of Newport, Wales, on 19 November 1929 and broken up.

Pennant numbers

References

Citations

Bibliography

 
 
 
 
 
 
 
 

 

1917 ships
R-class destroyers (1916)
Ships built on the River Clyde
World War I destroyers of the United Kingdom